Morné Schreuder (born 5 September 1979 in Windhoek) is a Namibian rugby union fly half. Schreuder competed for the Namibia national rugby union team at the 2007 Rugby World Cup.

References

1979 births
Living people
Namibia international rugby union players
Namibian rugby union players
Rugby union fly-halves
Rugby union players from Windhoek